The Crocus Stakes (in Japanese: クロッカスステークス), is a race for three-year-olds at Tokyo Racecourse.

Race Details

The race debuted on February 26, 1989. The race is for three-year-olds and is a 1,400 meter turf race. The race has usually been run in either January or February. The race is open to international horses.

Winners since 2015

Winners since 2015 include:

Past winners
Past winners include:

See also
 Horse racing in Japan
 List of Japanese flat horse races

References

Horse races in Japan